Nathaniel Alfred Hawkins (February 8, 1950 – January 31, 2021) was an American football wide receiver who played one season with the Houston Oilers of the NFL.  He played college football for UNLV Rebels football team and was drafted by the Pittsburgh Steelers in the 16th round of the 403rd pick of the 1972 NFL Draft.

Hawkins died from COVID-19 on January 31, 2021, eight days before his 71st birthday, during the COVID-19 pandemic in Texas.

References

1950 births
2021 deaths
American football wide receivers
Players of American football from Houston
Houston Oilers players
Pittsburgh Steelers players
UNLV Rebels football players
Deaths from the COVID-19 pandemic in Texas